I.P. Paul is an Indian National Congress politician from Thrissur city, India. He was the fourth mayor of Thrissur Municipal Corporation.

References

External links

Living people
Mayors of Thrissur
1949 births
Indian National Congress politicians from Kerala